The Sichuan clique was a group of warlords in the warlord era in China. During the period from 1927 to 1938, Sichuan was in the hands of five warlords: Liu Xiang, Yang Sen, Liu Wenhui, Deng Xihou, He Zhaode, and Tian Songyao, with minor forces being Xiong Kewu and Lü Chao.

Introduction 
After Qing dynasty's collapse, not one warlord had enough power to take on all the others at once, so many small battles occurred, pitting one warlord against another. The Sichuan Clique was divided into smaller warlord groups, or Defense Zones, separated from each other with distinct military, political, and economic boundaries. Large conflicts seldom developed, plotting and skirmishing characterized the Sichuanese political scene, and ephemeral coalitions and counter-coalitions emerged and vanished with equal rapidity.

However, Liu Xiang was the most influential of the Sichuan warlords. He controlled Chongqing and its surrounding areas. This region, sitting on the banks of the Yangtze river, was rich because of trade with provinces down river and therefore controlled much of the economic activity in Sichuan. From this position of strength, between 1930 and 1932 General Liu Wenhui and Liu Xiang improved their forces, organizing a small airforce and an armored car force.

In 1935 Liu Xiang ousted his uncle and rival warlord, Liu Wenhui, becoming Chairman of the Government of Sichuan Province with the support of Chiang Kai-shek.

In economic affairs, there was abusive minting and issuance of currency.

World War II 
In the Second Sino-Japanese War, the Sichuan clique made a huge contribution to oppose the Japanese army. Data shows all numbers of dead or injured soldiers (3.26 million in total), including 2.24 million from Sichuan clique. Especially, from 1939 to 1945, the death numbers of soldiers has 646,000 from Sichuan within a total 850,000. In the Battle of Shanghai, almost all 170,000 soldiers from Sichuan clique fell in battle, with only 2,000 managing to retreat to Hubei Province. Nine generals of the National Revolutionary Army died in World War II, of whom generals Li Jiayu, Wang Mingzhang and Rao Guohua were commanders from the Sichuan clique.

Memento 
On August 15, 1989, Chengdu City Government constructed new sculpture for memento at Wannian, Chengdu.

See also
Warlord era
List of Warlords
New Army, predecessor of Sichuan clique

References

Warlord cliques in Republican China
History of Sichuan